Tarit Kumar Sett (15 January 1931 – 29 January 2014) was an Indian cyclist. He competed in the 4,000 metres team pursuit  at the 1952 Summer Olympics in Helsinki.

References

1931 births
2014 deaths
Indian male cyclists
Olympic cyclists of India
Cyclists at the 1952 Summer Olympics